The History of local government districts in Buckinghamshire began in 1835 with the formation of poor law unions. This was followed by the creation of various forms of local government body. In 1894 the existing arrangements were replaced with a system of municipal boroughs, urban and rural districts, which remained in place until 1974.

Poor law unions
The parishes of the county were grouped under the Poor Law Amendment Act 1834 to form unions. Each union was administered by a board of guardians elected by the parish ratepayers. The boundaries of the unions would later be used to define rural sanitary districts in 1875 and rural districts in 1894. Poor law unions were abolished in 1930 by the Local Government Act 1929.

Local boards of health and sanitary districts
Following the enactment of the Public Health Act 1848, boards of health could be formed on petition of the inhabitants or where there was excess mortality. The Local Government Act 1858 simplified the process of creating local councils: ratepayers of a parish or area could adopt the Act by resolution, whereupon it would become a Local Government District, governed by a Local Board.

The system was rationalised by the Public Health Act 1875, which designated all municipal boroughs, local board districts, local government districts and improvement commissioners districts in England and Wales as urban sanitary districts. The existing local authority became an urban sanitary authority, without change of title. In Buckinghamshire this applied to Aylesbury, Beaconsfield, Buckingham, Chesham, Eton, Slough and Chepping Wycombe. Also created were rural sanitary districts, which were identical in area to poor law unions, less any urban sanitary district. The poor law guardians for the parishes in the district became the rural sanitary authority.

List of districts 1835–1894

Municipal boroughs, local boards and urban sanitary districts 1835–1894 
Municipal Boroughs (MBs) were created by the Municipal Corporations Act 1835, Local Board Districts (LBDs) were created by the Public Health Act 1848 and governed by a local board of health, Local Government Districts (LGDs) were created by the Local Government Act 1858 and governed by a local board. These all became urban sanitary authorities in 1875.

Rural sanitary districts 1875–1894

County districts 1894–1974
The Local Government Act 1894 reconstituted rural sanitary districts as rural districts and urban sanitary districts (other than municipal boroughs) as urban districts. Rural sanitary districts were split into multiple rural districts if they crossed county lines. Where a parish was partly in an urban sanitary district and partly in a rural sanitary district, it was split into two civil parishes. All districts were abolished in 1974.

References

.
.
Buckinghamshire
Buckinghamshire